Peripatopsis is a genus of South African velvet worms in the Peripatopsidae family. The number of legs in this genus ranges from as few as 16 pairs (e.g., in P. clavigera) to as many as 25 pairs (in P. moseleyi) and varies within species when the number is greater than 18 pairs. Velvet worms in this genus feature a last pair of legs (the genital pair) that is rudimentary or reduced in size, mainly in males. This genus exhibits matrotrophic viviparity, that is, mothers in this genus retain eggs in their uteri and supply nourishment to their embryos, but without any placenta.

Species 
The genus Peripatopsis consists of the following species:

 Peripatopsis alba Lawrence, 1931 — white cave velvet worm
 Peripatopsis balfouri (Sedgwick, 1885)
 Peripatopsis birgeri Ruhberg & Daniels, 2013
 Peripatopsis bolandi Daniels et al., 2013
 Peripatopsis capensis (Grube, 1866)
 Peripatopsis cederbergiensis Daniels et al., 2013
 Peripatopsis clavigera Purcell, 1899 — Knysna velvet worm
 Peripatopsis edenensis Barnes et al., 2020
 Peripatopsis ferox Barnes et al., 2020
 Peripatopsis hamerae Ruhberg & Daniels, 2013
 Peripatopsis intermedia  Hutchinson, 1928
 Peripatopsis janni  Ruhberg & Daniels, 2013
 Peripatopsis lawrencei McDonald et al., 2012
 Peripatopsis leonina Purcell, 1899 — Lion's Hill velvet worm
 Peripatopsis mellaria Barnes et al., 2020
 Peripatopsis mira Barnes et al., 2020
 Peripatopsis moseleyi (Wood-Mason, 1879)
 Peripatopsis overbergiensis McDonald et al., 2012 — Overberg velvet worm
 Peripatopsis purpureus  Daniels et al., 2013
 Peripatopsis sedgwicki Purcell, 1899 — Tsitsikamma velvet worm
 Peripatopsis storchi Ruhberg & Daniels, 2013
 Peripatopsis tulbaghensis Barnes et al., 2020

References 

Endemic fauna of South Africa
Onychophorans of temperate Africa
Onychophoran genera
Taxa named by R. I. Pocock
Taxonomy articles created by Polbot